Brenda Irene Dickson is an American actress who originated the role of Jill Foster Abbott on the soap opera The Young and the Restless.

Early life and education 
Dickson was born in Long Beach, California. As a teenager, she toured Southeast Asia singing and dancing for the armed forces with Bob Hope. At the age of 17, she won the title of Miss California USA in the Miss World pageant; it led to acting offers but she decided to continue performing at USO shows while studying acting at the Lee Strasberg Theatre and Film Institute in Los Angeles.

Career 
Dickson made her stage debut at the Beverly Hills Playhouse and went on to appear in stage roles in the Los Angeles area. She made her feature film debut in the 1972 film Deathmaster. She appeared in guest roles on Men at Law; The F.B.I.; Love, American Style; Here We Go Again; and the prime-time soap opera Falcon Crest.

Dickson played the role of Jill Foster Abbott on The Young and the Restless from 1973 to 1980, then again from 1983 to 1987. Dickson was let go from the show in 1987. She filed a $10 million lawsuit against Columbia Pictures in an effort to be reinstated.
In the lawsuit, Dickson claimed William J. Bell blacklisted her and wreaked havoc on her personal and professional life by hiring "Mafia cartel judges and attorneys" to "ruin" her life. As a result, she ended up "broke and homeless" and claimed to have been blocked from working.

In 1987, Dickson released the film Welcome to My Home, described as a "vanity film" which showcased her home and wardrobe. A YouTube parody became an Internet meme and has been removed and re-uploaded several times. In 2018, its influence was profiled in Vanity Fair. Dickson, who was interviewed for the article, revealed that she financed the film with $5,000 of her own money.

In May 2013, Blue Boulevard Publications released Dickson's memoir, My True Hidden Hollywood Story.

Personal life

Marriages 
Dickson has been married twice. Her first husband was dentist Robert Rifkin whom she married on September 30, 1976. Dickson and Rifkin divorced in 1983. She married attorney Jan Weinberg on December 25, 1997. They were divorced in 2006.

Legal issues 
In 2007, Dickson was jailed in Hawaii because of a civil contempt order stemming from a divorce judgment from her ex-husband Jan Weinberg. She said she was the victim and wasn't given a fair divorce hearing. Released after 16 days, she was sent back to jail and released after more than three months.

In 2009, the judgment in Weinberg v. Dickson was set aside after an appeals court found that the judge in the original trial had abused his discretion in not guaranteeing Dickson a fair trial and that her imprisonment had been unlawful.

Filmography

Awards and nominations 

 1986 Soap Opera Digest Award nomination for Outstanding Villainess in a Daytime Serial The Young and the Restless. 
 1988 Soap Opera Digest Award for Outstanding Villainess in a Daytime Serial The Young and the Restless.

References

External links 
 
 

Living people
20th-century American actresses
Actresses from Long Beach, California
American soap opera actresses
American television actresses
Lee Strasberg Theatre and Film Institute alumni
21st-century American women
Year of birth missing (living people)